Ajmera Global School is one of the leading International Schools in Borivali, Mumbai; an IB World School, following Primary Years Program (PYP) from Nursery to Class 5 and Cambridge's IGCSE curriculum from Class 6 to 10.

The educational journey at AGS is so designed as to provide a structured opportunity to develop students’ intellect and their senses in assimilating and processing data to increase knowledge and understanding of both themselves and the world around them.

The students of the school  are encouraged to form positive relationships based on mutual trust and respect with peers and staff. Such relationships build a foundation that enables them to be successful and confident learners, who view learning as a lifelong journey and value self-improvement, personal achievements and the recognition of others.

History

Ajmera Global School was established in 2006, founded by Dhaval and Prachi Ajmera.

See also 
 List of schools in Mumbai
 List of schools in India

References

External links
 Official website

International schools in Mumbai
Private schools in Mumbai
Borivali
Educational institutions established in 2006
2006 establishments in Maharashtra